Isabel Dada Rinker  (September 11, 1941 – June 14, 2017) was a Salvadoran actress and poet, considered a pioneer of theater in El Salvador.

Training and artistic career
Isabel Dada was born in San Salvador on September 11, 1941, the daughter of Teresa Rinker de Dada (born in Nicaragua and nationalized Honduran), and Ventura M. Dada (born in Jerusalem and nationalized German, whose ancestors were from Greece). She first performed at the National Theater of El Salvador in the play Soy una linda muñeca for three years. She traveled to the United States to study for a Bachelor of Commerce and Bilingual Secretariat degree, and at 18 she went to Mexico to attend a theater course.

Her career as a professional actress began in 1967 when she joined the University Theater of the University of El Salvador, under Spanish director .

In 1993, Dada founded the William Shakespeare Theater Academy. In 1996, she was nominated for the Helen Hayes Award in Washington, D.C., for her role as El Ama in the production of Doña Rosita la soltera. The same year, she began hosting the radio show Homenaje a la Vida, which was dedicated to universal poetry.

On October 16, 2003, she was recognized by the Legislative Assembly as "Most Meritorious Actress of El Salvador", by virtue of "the outstanding contributions made to the scenic art of our country."

In 2016, she was part of the cast of the film Volar: una historia sobre el olvido, under the direction of Brenda Vanegas, playing Esther, a woman who suffers from Alzheimer's disease.

Isabel Dada died in San Salvador on June 14, 2017 due to health problems.

Plays written
 1994–1996: La Madona de las cuatro lunas

Filmography
 1969: Los peces fuera del agua
 2006: Volar: una historia sobre el olvido

Awards and nominations
 1996: Nominated for the Helen Hayes Award for her role as El Ama in Doña Rosita la soltera
 1999: Nominated as an honorary member of the Ateneo de El Salvador
 2000: Nominated as a "Notable Figure of the 20th Century" by the Mayor of San Salvador
 2003: Named "Most Meritorious Actress of El Salvador" by the Legislative Assembly
 2008:  presented by the President of El Salvador

References

External links
 

1941 births
2017 deaths
20th-century actresses
21st-century actresses
People from San Salvador
Salvadoran film actors